Geronimo (1829–1909) was a Chiricahua Apache leader.

Geronimo may also refer to:

Places in the United States
 Geronimo, Arizona
 Geronimo, Oklahoma, a town
 Geronimo, Texas, an unincorporated community and census-designated place
 Geronimo Creek, Texas

People
 Geronimo (name), a list of people with the given name or surname
 Saint Francis de Geronimo (1642–1716), Jesuit priest and missionary who was canonized by Gregory XVI in 1839 
 Don Geronimo (born 1958), stage name of radio personality Michael Sorce
 Mic Geronimo, stage name of American hip-hop rapper Michael McDermon (born 1973)

Arts and entertainment

Fictional characters
 Geronimo (Kinnikuman), in the Kinnikuman manga series 
 Geronimo, the figurehead of the resistance in Colony
 Fatz Geronimo, in The Rock-afire Explosion, an animatronic robot band that played in Showbiz Pizza Place
 Geronimo Stilton, in the children's book series with the same title

Films
 Geronimo (1939 film), starring Chief Thundercloud
 Geronimo (1962 film), starring Chuck Connors
 Geronimo (1993 film), starring Joseph Runningfox
 Geronimo (2014 film), a French film
 Geronimo: An American Legend, a 1993 film starring Wes Studi, Matt Damon, Robert Duvall, and Gene Hackman

Music
 "Geronimo" (The Shadows song),  a 1963 song by the Shadows
"Geronimo" (Aura Dione song), a 2011 song by Danish singer-songwriter Aura Dione
 "Geronimo" (Sheppard song), a 2014 song by Australian band Sheppard
 "Geronimo", a 1953 song by Les Elgart And His Orchestra
 "Geronimo", a 1971 reggae single by Bruce Ruffin
 "Geronimo", a 1956 song by the Four Voices
 "Geronimo", a 1970 song by Symarip as the Pyramids

Ships
 Geronimo (yacht), a French trimaran
 , two US Navy tugs
 , a World War II Liberty ship

Other uses
 Geronimo (alpaca), the subject of a failed campaign to prevent his euthanisation
 Geronimo (exclamation), traditionally used by a parachutist upon jumping from an airplane
 Operation Geronimo (disambiguation), several military operations
 Forward Operating Base Geronimo, a US Marine Corps base in Afghanistan
 "Geronimo", the codename for Osama bin Laden during Operation Neptune's Spear
 Apache Geronimo, an open source application server developed by the Apache Software Foundation
 Geronimo FM, a radio station in Indonesia
 Geronimo Motor Company, an American vehicle manufacturer which produced the Geronimo automobile from 1917 to 1920

See also
 San Geronimo (disambiguation)
 San Jerónimo (disambiguation)